Madea's Class Reunion is an 2003 American stage play created, written, produced and directed by Tyler Perry. The live performance released on VHS and DVD (October 2, 2003) was recorded live in Detroit at the Fox Theatre on September 13, 2003 (Perry's 34th birthday). The play stars Tyler Perry as Madea and Dr. Willie Leroy Jones, David Mann as Leroy Brown and Tamela Mann as Cora.

Plot
Tyler Perry's outrageous and tough granny character, Madea, is traveling to the Pandora Hotel, the venue for her 50-year class reunion. Running afoul of the law, Madea still manages to teach valuable lessons amidst the comedy and chaos, addressing the importance of forgiveness and the value of friendship. In addition to Madea, the insane bellboy/bartender, "Dr." Willie Leroy Jones (new character played by Perry), is causing ruckus in the already rowdy hotel before she even arrives. Willie is suffering from an unknown number of Mental illnesses claiming at times to be on lithium, Prozac, and Xanax and is likely criminally insane as he mentions a probation officer.

Madea, her daughter Cora, and her colorful crazy neighbor and classmate, Mr. Brown (whose wife from the previous play, Mattie, died from Alzheimer's complications and was cremated) help married couple Corey and Trina Jeffrey (Terrell Carter, Pam Taylor) come to terms with infidelity. A woman Stephanie (Cheryl "Pepsii" Riley) hurt by years of sexual and chemical torment must give up prostituting herself with her abusive husband (D'Wayne Gardner), and reconcile with her tired elderly mother Emma (Chandra Currelley-Young) who was fired by the evil manager of the Pandora, Ann (Chantell Christopher), who is having an affair with her son's father (Anselmo Gordon) who is married to Cora's friend Diana (Judy Peterson), who is too reliant on her man.

While all of this takes place, Madea enters with her usual flair and quickly cuts through all the lies and secrets and forces everyone to see their situations in a new light giving aid and advice to all. They save the Jeffreys’ marriage through the timely interruption of a would be affair with Ann by forcing the woman away and reminding the husband that he stilled loved his wife. Madea convinces Stephanie to break free of her husband and in so doing gain her independence, her self-respect, and a measure of revenge for all the years of abuse. In so doing Stephanie also reconciles with her mother healing their bond. Throughout Madea battles Ann and during a visit to the spa with Diana reveals the relationship between Ann and Diana's husband. Diana confronts Ann and is shocked to learned she has given the man a child and in response she kicks her husband out of her life and turns her life over to God.

In the finale we learn that Emma, a long time employee of the hotel, had spoken to the owner about her previous termination by Ann only to be reminded that her previous purchase of stocks in the company to keep it afloat during a financial crisis had blossomed proving her with an impressive fortune. Citing her cruel treatment of employees and her less than satisfying contact with customers Emma fires Ann much to everyone's delight. Before leaving Madea reveals that Mr. Brown is actually Cora's father much to Cora's then despair. Everyone is shown repairing their relationships as the play ends with a powerful and grateful appeal from the cast to Christ for his aid and his goodness.

Shows

Cast
 Tyler Perry as Madea and Dr. Willie Leroy Jones
 Chandra Currelley-Young as Emma
 Cheryl Pepsii Riley as Stephanie
 David Mann as Mr. Brown
 Judy Peterson as Diana Massey
 Tamela Mann as Cora
 Terrell Carter as Corey Jeffrey
 Pam Taylor as Trina Jeffrey
 Chantell Christopher as Ann
 D'Wayne Gardner as Horace
 Anselmo Gordon as Clarence Massey
 Ahmad Jamal McGhee as DJ & Waiter

The Band 

 Mike Frazier - Musical Director / Bass
 Eric Morgan - Drums
 Jimmy Wyatt - Keyboards
 Sean Allen - Keyboards
 Mike Charbonneau - Sound
 Bruce Danz - Sound

Musical numbers
All songs written and/or produced by Tyler Perry.
 "Someday" – Cora
 "Gospel Medley" – Brown, Emma and Cora
 "One More Chance" – Trina
 "I Need Thee" – Emma
 "What If I Did?" – Corey
 "Taking My Life Back" – Stephanie
 "My Man" – Diana
 "You Can Make It (Through The Night)"  – Diana, Cora, Emma, Stephanie, Corey and Trina

External links

Class reunions in popular culture
Plays by Tyler Perry
African-American plays
2003 plays